Wale Adebanwi (born 1969) is a Nigerian-born first Black Rhodes Professor at St Antony's College, Oxford where he was, until June 2021, a Professor of Race Relations, and the Director of the African Studies Centre, School of Interdisciplinary Area Studies, and a Governing Board Fellow. He is currently a Presidential Penn Compact Professor of Africana Studies at the University of Pennsylvania. Adebanwi's research focuses on a range of topics in the areas of social change, nationalism and ethnicity, race relations, identity politics, elites and cultural politics, democratic process, newspaper press and spatial politics in Africa.

Education background 
Wale Adebanwi graduated with a first degree in Mass Communication from the University of Lagos, and later earned his M.Sc. and Ph.D. in Political Science from the University of Ibadan. He also has an MPhil. and a Ph.D. in Social Anthropology from the University of Cambridge.

Career 
Adebanwi worked as a freelance reporter, writer, journalist and editor for many newspapers and magazines before he joined the University of Ibadan's Department of Political Science as a lecturer and researcher. He was later appointed as an assistant professor in the African American and African Studies Department of the University of California, Davis, USA. He became a full professor at UC Davis in 2016.

Adebanwi is the co-editor of Africa: Journal of the International African Institute and the Journal of Contemporary African Studies.

Works 
His published works include:
 Nation as Grand Narrative: The Nigerian Press and the Politics of Meaning (University of Rochester Press, 2016)
 Yoruba Elites and Ethnic Politics in Nigeria: Obafemi Awolowo and Corporate Agency (Cambridge University Press, 2014)
 Authority Stealing: Anti-corruption War and Democratic Politics in Post-Military Nigeria (Carolina Academic Press, 2012)

In addition, he is the editor and co-editor of other books, including.
 The Political Economy of Everyday Life in Africa: Beyond the Margins (James Currey Publishers, 2017)
 Writers and Social Thought in Africa (Routledge, 2016)
 (co-edited with Ebenezer Obadare) Governance and the Crisis of Rule in Contemporary Africa (Palgrave Macmillan, 2016)
 (co-edited with Ebenezer Obadare) Democracy and Prebendalism in Nigeria: Critical Interpretations (Palgrave Macmillan, 2013).
 (co-edited with Ebenezer Obadare) Nigeria at Fifty: The Nation in Narration (Routledge, 2012)
 (co-edited with Ebenezer Obadare) Encountering the Nigerian State (Palgrave Macmillan, 2010).

References

Living people
1969 births
University of Ibadan alumni
University of Lagos alumni
Alumni of the University of Cambridge
Fellows of St Antony's College, Oxford
Yoruba academics
Academic staff of the University of Ibadan
Christ's School, Ado Ekiti alumni
University of Pennsylvania faculty